Brookstreet Pictures is a film production company with offices in West Hollywood, California and Ottawa, Ontario.  Founded by Trevor Matthews in 2004, the company produces and finances films.

Filmography
 O.G. (2018)
 First Kill (2017)
 Girl House (2015)
 Old West (2010)
 The Shrine (2010)
 Jack Brooks: Monster Slayer (2007)
 Moment of Truth (2007)
 The Other Celia (2005)
 Still Life (2005)
 Teen Massacre (2004)

References

External links 
 Official website

Film production companies of the United States
Film production companies of Canada
Mass media companies established in 2004
Privately held companies of Canada
Wesley Clover
Companies based in Ottawa
Canadian companies established in 2004